The Glockturm is the highest mountain in the Glockturmkamm group of the Ötztal Alps.

Mountains of Tyrol (state)
Mountains of the Alps
Alpine three-thousanders
Ötztal Alps